Laura Tanguy (born 2 August 1987 in Angers) is a French beauty pageant contestant who was awarded second runner-up of Miss France 2008,  having lost to Valérie Bègue in the official scoring. She also competed for the regional preliminary qualifiers for Miss France 2009, and campaigned to represent France at the Miss World and Miss Universe competitions, wishing to recall Valérie Bègue, after suggestive photos were leaked in a magazine two weeks after her coronation.

Biography
Tanguy is the daughter of an engineer and a laboratory assistant in physics and chemistry. She fluently speaks both French English, having lived in San Antonio up until her adolesence. During her time in France, Tanguy has lived in Écouflant, a town near Angers. She holds a Economic and Social Baccalaureate (Bac d'ES)[fr] (the equivalency of a US high school diploma), and is currently studying at the School of Nursing of Angers. Tanguy is an avid fan of tennis.

Tanguy is 5'10" and has green eyes.

Awards
 French representative to Miss Universe 2008
 French representative to Miss World 2008
 New Miss France 2008 
 Original 2nd runner-up of Miss France 2008
 Miss Pays de Loire 2007 (representing Cholet)
 Miss Maine-et-Loire 2006
 Miss Chrono des Herbiers 2005
 Finalist at the Elite Model Look 2003 (representing La Baule).

Representative as Miss France 2008
Following the controversy which arose on 21 December 2007, triggered by the publication of private photos of Valérie Bègue in the magazine Entrevue[fr], somewhat doubtful of the newly-elected Miss France, chairwoman of Miss France Committee, Geneviève de Fontenay, called for the resignation and dismissal of Bègue, two weeks after her reign as Miss France 2008.

After an agreement, Bègue was able to retain her title, but was adjudicated that she will not participate in any future Miss France contest, Miss Universe 2008, nor any contest in the presence of Geneviève de Fontenay.

On 6 January 2008, the President of the Miss France committee proclaimed Laura Tanguy, second runner-up of Valérie Bègue, as the successor of the title, alongside a mandate to represent France in the higher levels of the Miss World and Miss Universe pageants, and to accompany Geneviève de Fontenay to other regional elections (first runner-up, Miss New Caledonia, did not wish to hold the post for reasons relating to her studies).

References

External links
Dépêche AFP
Laura Tanguy, Miss Maine-et-Loire, remplace Miss France à l’étranger
Miss Pays de Loire représentera la France à l'élection de Miss Univers !

Living people
Miss France winners
Miss Universe 2008 contestants
Miss World 2008 delegates
1987 births
French female models
People from Angers